The  was a class of destroyers of the Imperial Japanese Navy (IJN) built during World War II to complement the , primarily for the role of anti-aircraft screening for carrier battle groups. During the war, the class proved to be a very capable multipurpose platform and was well regarded in the IJN.

Design and description
The Akizuki class was built using the newly developed Type 98 dual-purpose guns in four twin mounts as its main battery. The four turrets were placed in pairs fore and aft, with the middle positions located in a superfiring position. Unlike the larger weapons mounted by the preceding Kagerō class, these were true dual-purpose guns reloadable at any elevation and with a high reliability, rate of fire and range. It was intended that each vessel be fitted with two Type 94 fire-control directors capable of targeting high-angle targets, to be mounted above the bridge and in a small deckhouse near the aft mount: however, due to production shortages, the last five vessels in the class never received their second Type 94, and eventually it was removed from the aft position on all ships, and that location used for a triple Type 96 AA gun mount. Two twin-mount Type 96s were also located amidships.

Before the design was finalized, the Imperial Japanese Navy General Staff Office intervened, and insisted on the addition of a centerline-mounted Type 92 quadruple torpedo launcher with reloads, firing the Type 93 "Long Lance" torpedo. The class also carried two Type 94 depth charge projectors and 54 depth charges. These were increased to 72 depth charges for some of the later production vessels.
 
The hull was 50 feet longer, and the displacement was 700 tons larger than the preceding Kagerō class. Propulsion was by two Kampon geared steam turbines, each driving a single propeller shaft, using steam provided by three Kampon water-tube boilers. Unlike previous Japanese destroyer designs, there were two separate engine and boiler rooms for increased survivability in battle.

Ships surviving to 1944 also received the Type 13 radar, and the last five vessels in the class had the Type 21 replaced by the new Type 22 radar, and an additional Type 13 added to their EW suite.

In terms of anti-aircraft capability, as the war progressed, the number of Type 96 guns were gradually increased. In 1942–1943, the twin-mounts were replaced by triple-mounts, and another two triple-mount were added abreast the smokestack. In late 1944 to early 1945, surviving members of the class received another triple-mount abreast the bridge, and up to 24 more single-mounts were added to various locations, giving each vessel a total of 41 guns.

Operational history
Six of this class were authorized in 1939 Maru 4 Programme and another ten in the 1941 Maru Kyū Programme. Only one of the last four was even laid down before all were canceled. Later units of the Fuyutsuki and Michitsuki subclasses were completed to a simplified hull shape to decrease production time.

Another slightly larger group of 16 ships to an improved design of 2,933 tons was authorized in the 1942 Additional Naval Armaments Supplement Programme (as #770 to #785). This Programme was later subsumed into the Modified 5th Naval Armaments Supplement Programme with a total of 23 ships (vice 16) of 2,701 tons planned to follow (as #5061 to #5083). All of these were canceled before construction started.

Only six vessels survived the war, and four were used for war reparations.

Ships in classes

Akizuki class
Project number F51. General production type of the Akizuki class. Seven vessels were built under the Maru 4 Programme (Ship # 104–109) and the Maru Kyū Programme (Ship # 360).

Fuyutsuki class
Project number F51. The Fuyutsuki subclass were originally going to be built to the same specifications as the Akizuki class but construction was simplified. Four vessels were built under the Maru Kyū Programme (Ship # 361–364). Main differences from the Akizuki class were simplified bow design, removed rear deck house, and fitted two-dimensional air inlet for boilers. However, the IJN was not satisfied with the design. More modifications were ordered, leading to the Michitsuki subclass.

Michitsuki class
Project number F53. Final production model of the Akizuki class. Simplified more than Fuyutsuki class. Comprised the remaining 5 vessels from the Maru Kyū Programme (Ship # 365–369) and 16 vessels from the Additional Naval Armaments Supplement Programme (Ship #770-785). As the 1941 Additional Naval Armaments Supplement Programme was replaced by the Maru 5 Programme, the 16 Michitsuki class were re-planned to #5061-5076, to which were added another 6 vessels of this design - #5077-5082. However, only 1 vessel was completed.

References

Bibliography

Further reading
, National Archives of Japan.
Reference code: C12070120400, October (1).
Reference code: C12070510100, February (1).

External links

CombinedFleet.com: Akizuki-class destroyers
 USN Navsource

 
Akizuki